Tyrrell is a locality in the Rural City of Swan Hill and the Shire of Buloke, Victoria, Australia. Tyrrell West post office opened on 29 May 1909 and was closed on the 2 November 1914. Long Plains post office opened in 1902 and was closed on 31 July 1940.

References

Rural City of Swan Hill